Shao Xu (died ), courtesy name Sizu, was a military general and warlord of the Jin dynasty (266–420). Shao Xu was an official under the Youzhou warlord, Wang Jun but after Wang was killed in 314, he submitted to Han Zhao. In 315, Shao Xu declared his allegiance to Sima Rui in the south and revolted against Han. Shao Xu served as a loyal Jin vassal in Jizhou where he allied himself with the Duan chieftain, Duan Pidi before he was eventually captured by Shi Le in 320. Shi Le respected Shao Xu's loyalty and initially treated him as a guest. However, Shi Le became worried that he would rebel, and in 321, had him executed along with Duan Pidi.

Life

Career under Sima Ying, Gou Xi and Wang Jun 
Shao Xu was born in Anyang County in Wei Commandery. He was a simple man but was ambitious and keen on reading a wide range of history texts and astronomy. He was appointed into office by the Prince of Chengdu, Sima Ying. In 303, Sima Ying waged war against his brother, the Prince of Changsha, Sima Ai. Shao Xu was put off by this and advised Sima Ying to stop, but he was ignored. Shao Xu later joined Gou Xi's army, and where he was ordered to defend Qinshui County. 

As conflict in the north intensifies, Shao Xu decided to quit his position and return to his hometown. There, he befriended many renegades and amassed himself a huge following under his wing. The Youzhou warlord, Wang Jun acknowledged his presence and appointed him General of Pacification and Collection and Prefect of Leling. Shao Xu based himself in Yanci (厭次, around present-day Dezhou, Shandong), where he personally made his son, Shao Ai (邵乂) as Protector. Shao Xu would welcome refugees displaced by the ongoing war into his territory, making him rather popular among his people.

Wang Jun was defeated by the Han Zhao general Shi Le in 314. After hearing his defeat, Shao Xu surrendered to Shi Le, and the Han general took Shao Ai to make him his own Protector as a result. Later that year, Wang Jun's Administrator of Bohai, Liu Yin (劉胤, not to be confused with th Han Zhao prince, Liu Yin), fled to Shao Xu. During his stay with him, Liu Yin asked him to revolt against Shi Le. Not long after, the Duan Xianbei chieftain in Youzhou, Duan Pidi, who had aligned himself with Sima Rui in Jiankang, invited Shao Xu to re-pledge his allegiance to Jin. 

Shao Xu thus agreed to revolt against Shi Le. However, those under him quickly reminded him of Shao Ai's safety. Shao Xu wept and said, "How can I remain a traitor just to save my son?" Those who tried to stop him were killed by Shao Xu. After Shi Le heard of Shao Xu's betrayal, he had Shao Ai killed. Shao Xu sent Liu Yin to meet with Sima Rui and declare himself a vassal of Jin. Sima Rui agreed and appointed Shao Xu Administrator of Pingyuan. Shi Le besieged Shao Xu but reinforcements from Duan Pidi forced him to break the siege.

As a Jin vassal 
In 316, Sima Rui further promoted Shao Xu to Inspector of Jizhou. Shao Xu's son-in-law, Liu Xia helped Shao Xu to expand his numbers by gathering people in the regions between the Ji and Yellow River. The following year in 317, Shao Xu was one of the many warlords who tried to get Sima Rui to declare himself emperor, but this was met with rejection.

In 319, Duan Pidi was greatly defeated by Shi Le's forces. With nowhere left to run, he resorted to fleeing to Shao Xu and Shao welcomed him. The following year, Duan Pidi's forces were routed by his cousin Duan Mopei, who had allied himself with Shi Le. Duan Pidi pleaded to Shao Xu to help him defeat Mopei and Shao Xu agreed. The two men led their armies and defeated Pidi's cousin, forcing him to retreat.

Duan Pidi followed up his victory by trying to reclaim his former capital of Jicheng. Upon hearing this, Shi Le knew that Shao Xu was now left vulnerable. Shi Le sent his generals Shi Hu and Kong Chang to attack Shao Xu at Yanci. Shi Hu besieged Shao Xu while Kong Chang took eleven of his camps. Shao Xu decided to personally lead his army against Shi Hu, but Shi Hu was prepared and had laid an ambush by hiding his cavalries. When the time was ripe, his cavalries appeared and attacked Shao Xu, capturing him during the battle.

Shi Hu sent Shao Xu to order his city to surrender. Instead, Shao Xu shouted to his nephew, Shao Zhu (邵竺), to remain loyal to Jin and continue resisting. Meanwhile, Duan Pidi rushed back in attempt to save Yanci. Pidi's brother, Duan Wenyang (段文鴦) managed to break through Shi Hu army to allow him and Pidi to man the defence. Joining them were Shao Xu's son, Shao Ji (邵緝) and Xu's nephews, Shao Cun (邵存) and Shao Mi. Liu Yin, who was still in the south, upon hearing that Shao Xu was under attack, begged Sima Rui to send reinforcements and save him. Sima Rui refused and instead only passed Shao Xu's office over to his son, Shao Ji.

Captivity and execution 
Shao Xu was sent to Shi Le's capital in Xiangguo. Shi Le respected Shao Xu's loyalty, so he freed him from captivity and appointed him Attendant Officer of the Household Gentlemen. Shi Le also issued a policy to his generals to always present him a captured official that they deemed worthy because of Shao Xu's defiance. Shao Xu continued to impress Shi Le as during his capture, Shao Xu would grow his own vegetables and sell them in the market. Because of this, Shi Le rewarded Shao Xu with clothes and grains. Often times, he would sigh and try to set Shao Xu as an example in the court.

Duan Pidi and Shao Xu's family were finally defeated in 321. Despite Shi Le's respect for Shao Xu, Pidi's insolence made Shi Le worried that Shao Xu and Pidi would revolt in the future. Not long after, Shi Le ordered for Shao Xu and Pidi to be executed.

References 

 Fang, Xuanling (ed.) (648). Book of Jin (Jin Shu).
 Sima, Guang (1084). Zizhi Tongjian.

Jin dynasty (266–420) generals
321 deaths